The Asashio-class submarine is a submarine class of Japanese Maritime Self-Defense Force comprising four boats. The class were the first fleet submarines constructed for post-war Japan. The first submarine was authorized as part of the 1963 shipbuilding programme. Their design improved on previous Japanese classes by being larger to obtain better seaworthiness with greater torpedo stowage. The class entered service in the late 1960s and remained as such until the mid-1980s when they were taken out of service.

Design and description 

Based on the preceding , the Asashio class were of similar design but with a different shaped bow and improved sonar. They are considered the first fleet submarines constructed for Japan in the post-World War II era. The Asashio class had a complement of 80. The Asashio class were propelled by two propellers powered by a diesel-electric system comprising two Kawasaki diesel engines creating  and two electric motors creating . This gave the submarines a maximum speed of  submerged and  while surfaced. 

The vessels were equipped with eight torpedo tubes, six in the bow and two in the stern. The sources disagree on the torpedo armament, with two sources stating that all eight were for  torpedoes, while another states that only the forward six were for the 533 mm torpedoes and the stern tubes were for  torpedoes. Moore and Gardiner, Chumbley and Budzbon state that the stern tubes were for "swim-out" torpedoes with Gardiner, Chumbley and Budzbon adding they were for anti-submarine warfare (ASW) and that the forward tubes were intended for US Mark 54 torpedoes. They carried a total of 20 torpedoes. The Asahio class mounted ZPS-3 radar, SQS-4 active sonar and JQS-3A and JQQ-2A passive sonars. The were also equipped with BLR-1 intercept equipment.

Boats

Construction and career
The first submarine Asashio was ordered as part of the 1963 shipbuilding programme. Construction was split between the Kawasaki and Mitsubishi yards at Kobe. The submarines were used for ASW training for surface ships in naval exercises. The class was deleted in the mid-1980s.

See also
 JDS Kuroshio - First submarine acquired by the JMSDF, via it being loaned by the U.S under the Military Assistance Program.
  - First naval submarine built in post-war Japan.

Citations

References
 
 
 
 

Submarine classes
Japan Maritime Self-Defense Force
 
Postwar Japan